The  is part of Japan National Route 329 in Uruma, Okinawa. It cuts through the cliffs south of Ishikawa to connect the Ishikawa By-pass to Route 329 proper. The by-pass, tunnel, and bridge were built in the 1990s.

National highways in Japan